Melissa Therese McLinden (born September 13, 1964) is a former volleyball player. She played for the University of Arizona and for the United States national team at the 1988 Summer Olympics.

She has coached 200+ athletes, won National Qualifiers and has been among the top 10 in the Open Division.

References

1964 births
Living people
Olympic volleyball players of the United States
Volleyball players at the 1988 Summer Olympics
American women's volleyball players
Arizona Wildcats women's volleyball players
Pan American Games medalists in volleyball
Pan American Games bronze medalists for the United States
Medalists at the 1987 Pan American Games